"He's My Man" is a single released by Motown singing group The Supremes, listed as catalog number M1358F. It is the lead single released from their 1975 self-titled album, The Supremes. The single's peak position was 69 on the US R&B charts, and number-one on the regional Disco charts.

Critical reception
James Hamilton of Record Mirror wrote, 'Already hailed by many as a return to form, this comes - and - goes rhythm plopper ain't the Three Degrees but will please their bank manager.' Cashbox published 'The Supremes don't give you one second of doubt on what may be the hottest r&b, disco, top 40 crossover records to emerge from the Motown camp in recent months. Absolutely inspired production by Greg Wright and arrangements by Dave Blumbert — this disk's got everything, from an incredible, pulsating bass track, rhythm that'll knock you over, and strings that allow those super vocals to come on strong Five stars! Flip: No info, available.

Charts

Personnel
Lead vocals by Mary Wilson and Scherrie Payne
Background vocals by Cindy Birdsong, Scherrie Payne, and Mary Wilson

References

1975 singles
1975 songs
The Supremes songs
Motown singles